Pa Bangar is a settlement in the Marudi division of Sarawak, Malaysia.

Burial sites near the village include a mass burial (Benatuh Rayeh) consisting of seventeen jars (Balanai), said to be remains of people from Pa Bangar who had died elsewhere, brought back for mass burial; and Benatuh Ra’an Sembariew with thirteen jars and seven stone pillars (Batuh Senuped).

Neighbouring settlements include:

References

Villages in Sarawak